The 1926 Vermont gubernatorial election took place on November 2, 1926. Incumbent Republican Franklin S. Billings, per the "Mountain Rule", did not run for re-election to a second term as Governor of Vermont. Republican candidate John E. Weeks defeated Democratic candidate Herbert C. Comings to succeed him.

Republican primary

Results

Democratic primary

Results

General election

Candidates
John E. Weeks, Vermont Commissioner of Public Welfare
Herbert C. Comings, former Vermont Commissioner of Finance

Results

References

Vermont
1926
Gubernatorial
November 1926 events